Carmenta querci is a moth of the family Sesiidae. It was described by Henry Edwards in 1882, and is known from the United States, including Colorado and Arizona.

Larvae have been reared from galls on Quercus arizonica and Quercus oblongifolia.

References

Sesiidae
Moths described in 1882